Sithney Green is a hamlet in the parish of Sithney, Cornwall, England, United Kingdom.

References

Hamlets in Cornwall